The Margaria was a French automobile manufactured between 1910 and 1912.  A 2297 cc four-cylinder which was shown at the 1910 Paris Salon, the shaft-drive car sold in chassis form for 5000 francs.  M. Margaria teamed up with M. Launay to build the SCAP beginning in 1912.

References
David Burgess Wise, The New Illustrated Encyclopedia of Automobiles.

Defunct motor vehicle manufacturers of France